Botany Boyz are a rap group from Houston, Texas, United States. They are the owners of the labels Big Shot Records and Plat-Num Productions.

History
One of the foremost contributors to the Houston screw scene, the Botany Boyz were part of the Screwed Up Click in the early to mid 1990s. The group name is a reference to Botany Lane in the Cloverland area of Houston where they resided.

Their first album, Thought of Many Ways, was released on their own label, Big Shot Records, in 1997; its follow-up, Forever Botany, was released in 1999 and managed to crack the Billboard Top R&B/Hip-Hop charts at #99 in 2000 as the Houston rap scene became more popular across the US. Since then, the members have concentrated more on solo projects, with C-Note being the most successful.

The Botany Boyz were featured on the platinum selling Sittin' Fat Down South, with the single "Chop, Chop, Chop" produced by legendary southern producer Bruce "Grim" Rhodes.

Members

Current members
 B.G. Duke
 C-Note
 D-Red
 Will-Lean

Past members
 Big D-E-Z
 B.G. Gator (deceased)
 Lil' 3rd
 Lil' Head
 lil reese

Discography

Studio albums
Thought of Many Ways (1997)
Forever Botany (2000)

Extended plays
Smokin N' Leanin (1995)

Solo projects
C-Note - Third Coast Born (1999)
C-Note - Third Coast Born 2000 (2000)
D-Red - Smokin' & Lean'n 2000 (2000)
Will-Lean - The Chemist (2000)
C-Note - Street Fame (2003)
D-Red - Still Smokin' & Leanin' Vol. 1 (2004)
C-Note - Network'n (2006)
Will-Lean - Mr. Triple Beam (2010)
C-Note - Birds Vs Words (2016)

References

Musicians from Texas
Screwed Up Click members
Rappers from Houston
Underground hip hop groups
Musical groups from Houston
African-American musical groups
Musical groups established in 1994
American hip hop groups
Southern hip hop groups
Gangsta rap groups
1994 establishments in Texas